GRA or Gra may refer to:

Government and politics 
 Gender Recognition Act 2004, a British act of law
 Genootskap van Regte Afrikaners ("Society of Real Afrikaners"), which promoted Afrikaner culture and language
 Ghana Revenue Authority
 Gibraltar Regulatory Authority
 Gobabis Residents' Association, a political party in Namibia

Transportation 
 Granby station, in Colorado, United States
 Grande Raccordo Anulare, a highway in Rome, Italy
 Grantham railway station, England (National Rail station code GRA)

Other uses 
 Georgia Research Alliance, an American non-profit organization
 Girls Rodeo Association, now the Women's Professional Rodeo Association
 Glucocorticoid remediable aldosteronism
 Grey relational analysis
 Greyhound Racing Association
 Vilna Gaon (1720–1797), Polish-Lithuanian Jewish scholar, referred to as the Gra